Ruth M. Leverton (March 23, 1908 – September 14, 1982) was an American home economist. Leverton's research led to advancements in the understanding of protein metabolism. She pioneered the use of human subjects to study nutrients and their interactions through controlled feeding studies where research participants lived in university live-in facilities alongside nonparticipants.

See also

 Constance Kies

References

Further reading
 

1908 births
1982 deaths
American women nutritionists
American nutritionists